Grynberg is a surname. Notable people with the surname include:

Henryk Grynberg (born 1936), Polish writer and actor
Jack J. Grynberg (born 1932), Polish-born American businessman
Michał Grynberg (1909–2000), Polish historian
Roman Grynberg, Polish professor, author, and academic

See also
Grinberg